Oxytropis sordida is a species of flowering plant belonging to the family Fabaceae.

Its native range is Northern and Eastern Europe to Northern Russian Far East and Mongolia.

References

sordida